Eshqabad (also Romanized as ‘Eshqābād; also known as Shāhābād) is a village in Tudeshk Rural District, Kuhpayeh District, Isfahan County, Isfahan Province, Iran. At the 2006 census, its population was 23, in 7 families.

References 

Populated places in Isfahan County